Chionodes hinnella is a moth of the family Gelechiidae. It is found in Spain.

The length of the forewings is 7–8 mm.

References

Moths described in 1935
Chionodes
Moths of Europe